Vedant Institute of Management & Technology (VIMT) was an engineering college run and managed by Choudhary Bishambhar Singh Education Society. It was established in 2007.
VIMT is approved by the All India Council for Technical Education (AICTE), New Delhi and affiliated to Uttar Pradesh Technical University (UPTU).

History
In 2003, Ved Ram Yadav began to develop Garhmukteshwar into an education hub and he founded Choudhary Bishambhar Singh Education Society. This society was used to promote the quality of higher education in Garhmukteshwar and its first act was the launch of the Vedant College of Education in 2004.

Later, in 2007, the school became Vedant Institute of Management & Technology after adding degrees in Education and Physical Education to its catalogue.

In 2019, the school announced it would close once it had graduated students who had already enrolled.

Courses

VIMT offers 4 Year Bachelor of Tech Programs in the following specialties:
 Civil Engineering
 Computer Science & Engineering
 Electrical & Electronics Engineering
 Electronics & Communication Engineering
 Information Technology
 Mechanical Engineering

References

Private engineering colleges in Uttar Pradesh
Hapur district
Educational institutions established in 2007
2007 establishments in Uttar Pradesh